Vega de Poja is a parish (administrative division) in Siero, a municipality within the province and autonomous community of Asturias, in northern Spain. The parish is located to the North East of the administrative capital of the municipality, Pola de Siero, between Highway AS-331 and Highway  AS-248.

According to the Instituto Nacional de Estadística (Spain), in 2008 Vega de Poja had a population of 977.

Origin and history

The first documented reference to the parish church of Saint Martin appears in the Middle Ages, in approximately 905, during the reign of Alfonso (The Great) III.

References

External links
 Asturian society of economic and industrial studies, English language version of "Sociedad Asturiana de Estudios Económicos e Industriales" (SADEI)

Parishes in Siero